Donald Lee (29 April 1933 – 10 August 2016) was a South African cricketer. He played first-class cricket for Griqualand West and Orange Free State between 1952 and 1968. Later in his career, he became a first-class cricket umpire.

References

External links
 

1933 births
2016 deaths
South African cricketers
Griqualand West cricketers
Free State cricketers
People from Vryburg
South African cricket umpires